The 1998 Estoril Open was a tennis tournament played on outdoor clay courts. This event was the 9th edition of the Estoril Open, included in the 1998 ATP Tour International Series and in the 1998 ITF Women's Circuit. Both the men's and the women's events took place at the Estoril Court Central, in Oeiras, Portugal, from 6 April until 13 April 1998.

Finals

Men's singles

 Alberto Berasategui defeated  Thomas Muster, 3–6, 6–1, 6–3

Women's singles
 Barbara Schwartz defeated  Raluca Sandu, 6–2, 6–3

Men's doubles

 Donald Johnson /  Francisco Montana defeated  David Roditi /  Fernon Wibier, 6–1, 2–6, 6–1

Women's doubles
 Caroline Dhenin /  Émilie Loit defeated  Radka Bobková /  Caroline Schneider, 6–2, 6–3

References

External links
Official website

1998
Estoril
Estoril Open
 Estoril Open